The Oberaarrothorn is a mountain of the Bernese Alps, on the border between the Swiss cantons of Valais and Bern. It is south of the Oberaarjoch, between the Fiescher Glacier and the Oberaar Glacier.

References

External links
 Oberaarrothorn on Hikr

Mountains of the Alps
Alpine three-thousanders
Mountains of Switzerland
Mountains of Valais
Mountains of the canton of Bern
Bern–Valais border